Mike Barry was an offensive line coach for the National Football League Detroit Lions. While in college, Barry played at Nebraska from 1964 to 1966 and at Southern Illinois University from 1966 to 1969.

Prior to coaching the Lions, Barry coached at the college football level for Iowa State, North Carolina State, University of Tennessee, University of Colorado, and the University of Southern California.

Mike's son, Joe Barry, coached alongside him with the Detroit Lions.

Coaching timeline
 1977–1980 Southern Illinois, offensive line coach
 1980–1983 University of Arizona, offensive line coach
 1984–1985 San Antonio Gunslingers, offensive line coach
 1986 Iowa State University, offensive line coach
 1987–1992 University of Colorado, offensive line coach
 1993–1997 University of Southern California, offensive line coach
 1998–2002 University of Tennessee, offensive line coach
 2003–2005 North Carolina State University, offensive line coach
 2006–2008 Detroit Lions, assistant offensive line coach

References

External links
 https://web.archive.org/web/20070927001312/http://www.detroitlions.com/bio.cfm?bio_id=359&section_id=15&top=21&level=2&season=1

Detroit Lions coaches
USC Trojans football coaches
Colorado Buffaloes football coaches
NC State Wolfpack football coaches
Tennessee Volunteers football coaches
Nebraska Cornhuskers football players
Living people
Year of birth missing (living people)
Arizona Wildcats football coaches
Iowa State Cyclones football coaches